Mount Etna Caves is a national park in The Caves, Shire of Livingstone, Queensland, Australia, 544 km northwest of Brisbane. 

The park's caves are the roosting site for more than 80 percent of Australia's breeding population of little bent-wing bats. It is also one of the few places in Australia supporting a colony of the endangered Ghost Bat.

History 
The Fitzroy Caves National Park was gazetted in 1973 with a focus on the protection of the bats rather than the caves. In 1990 it was renamed Mount Etna Caves National Park. In 1999 the park was extended to provide more protection to the caves.

See also

 Protected areas of Queensland

References

National parks of Central Queensland
Caves of Queensland
Wild caves
Limestone caves
Protected areas established in 1994